Wishes: A Magical Gathering of Disney Dreams was a fireworks show at the Magic Kingdom theme park of Walt Disney World. The show debuted at the park on October 9, 2003, and was developed by Walt Disney Creative Entertainment, under the direction of VP Parades & Spectaculars, Steve Davison, who was assigned to create a replacement for the 32-year-old Fantasy in the Sky fireworks. Several variations of the show at Walt Disney World include Happy HalloWishes during "Mickey's Not-So-Scary Halloween Party", Holiday Wishes during "Mickey's Very Merry Christmas Party", and Magic, Music and Mayhem during the 2007 event Disney's Pirate and Princess Party. The multimedia version at Disneyland Park in Disneyland Paris premiered on July 16, 2005 and had its final show on August 25, 2007. The show at the Magic Kingdom was sponsored by Pandora Jewelry.  On February 9, 2017, it was announced by the Disney Parks Blog that Wishes: A Magical Gathering of Disney Dreams would conclude its run at the Magic Kingdom. The show was presented for the last time on May 11, 2017 at the Magic Kingdom Park and was replaced by Happily Ever After on May 12, 2017.

Wishes at the Magic Kingdom

Wishes: A Magical Gathering of Disney Dreams
 The show was hosted by Jiminy Cricket, the Blue Fairy, and revolved around the wishes of famous Disney characters - good and bad. The lights on Cinderella Castle changed colors throughout the show, reflecting the different stages of Wishes''' narrative. During different parts of the show, a "wishing star" firework was shot, cresting approximately 100 feet above the castle’s bright spires. While most of the characters in the show are only heard as part of the show's music track, Wishes also featured an appearance from Tinker Bell as she flew from the tallest spire of Cinderella Castle. Wishes included 683 fireworks, that fire during the 557 cues.

The show begins with the Blue Fairy and Jiminy Cricket encouraging the guests to make a wish. Soon, Tinkerbell flies out of the castle, as Cinderella, Snow White, Ariel, Peter Pan, Pinocchio, and Aladdin make their wishes. Soon, Jiminy tells people to have Courage, as an instrumental version of Go the Distance plays. Next, Jiminy tells people that wishes come true when they're from the Heart, and a medley of music from Cinderella, Sleeping Beauty, and Beauty And The Beast plays. After Jiminy tells the audience that dreams can happen in the most unexpected ways, The Genie appears as Fireworks synchronized to Friend Like Me play, which soon changes into The Sorcerer's Apprentice. Suddenly, Jiminy warns guests to let their conscience be their guide, as The Evil Queen invades the performance. Jiminy then informs the audience to be careful what they Wish for, as they could end up in an Awful Mess, but reminds them that when things look bad, Fate steps in to see it through. The Blue Fairy returns to remind guests that they must always believe in their wishes. The show ends with a cavalcade of Wishes and Jiminy thanking the audience.

Happy HalloWishes: A Grim Grinning Ghost Spooktacular in the SkyHalloWishes debuted in 2005 (until 2018) and was performed at the separate-admission event Mickey's Not-So-Scary Halloween Party at the Magic Kingdom in lieu of the regular Wishes show. Taking its name from the theme song for the attraction Haunted Mansion, the show featured fireworks synchronized to  Disney Villains themes and other Halloween music.

Holiday Wishes: Celebrate The Spirit of the SeasonHoliday Wishes: Celebrate the Spirit of the Season replaced Wishes during Mickey's Very Merry Christmas Party, and during the park's regular operating days near Christmas Day (until 2018). The show featured fireworks performed to remixed Christmas songs (including "Spirit of the Season") and an appearance by Tinker Bell.

Magic, Music, and Mayhem

This fireworks show replaced Wishes at Mickey's Pirate and Princess Party, and features music from the Disney Princess library of animated movies and the Pirates of the Caribbean movie franchise.

Disney's Celebrate America

This fireworks show replaced Wishes at July 4 every year since 2008, and features music that celebrates the traditions, spirit and music of the United States of America. The show also presented at the Disneyland Resort (with Disney California Adventure having a shorter version) as well.

Fantasy in the Sky: New Year's Eve Countdown
During New Year's Eve, the regular Wishes show was shown and then supplemented by a special presentation of Fantasy in the Sky, featuring numerous fireworks and instrumental music from an array of Disney films and attractions. The show is hosted by Mickey Mouse, Minnie Mouse and Goofy.

Summer Nightastic!
In 2010, Walt Disney World replaced Wishes with another fireworks show during a summer entertainment package called "Summer Nightastic!".  Disney announced that this would be the Magic, Music, and Mayhem show from Disney's Pirate and Princess Party.

Wishes at Disneyland Paris
Disneyland Park introduced a fireworks and multimedia show based on the Magic Kingdom's Wishes pyrotechnics show. The show ran its first year from July 16, 2005 to August 28, 2005, with performances every night at 11:15 p.m. The show ran every summer season from 2005 until 2007 and was replaced in 2008 by The Enchanted Fireworks, and in 2012, Disney Dreams!On (New Year’s Eve 2022), “Wishes” returned for a one-off celebration spectacular including new projections on Sleeping Beauty Castle.

See also
 Remember... Dreams Come True Believe... There's Magic in the Stars Disney's Celebrate America Disney Dreams! Magical: Disney's New Nighttime Spectacular of Magical Celebrations Disney in the Stars''

References

External links
 
 Wishes Nighttime Spectacular Official Site (Final Version)

Walt Disney Parks and Resorts fireworks
Magic Kingdom